2015 Emmy Awards may refer to:

 67th Primetime Emmy Awards, the 2015 Emmy Awards ceremony that honored primetime programming during June 2014 – May 2015
 42nd Daytime Emmy Awards, the 2015 Emmy Awards ceremony that honored daytime programming during 2014
 36th Sports Emmy Awards, the 2015 Emmy Awards ceremony that honored sports programming during 2014
 43rd International Emmy Awards, the 2015 ceremony that honored international programming

Emmy Award ceremonies by year